Excel Charter Academy can refer to:
 A charter school in Los Angeles, California operated by PUC Schools
 A charter school in Grand Rapids, Michigan operated by National Heritage Academies